Lloyds is an unincorporated community in Dorchester County, Maryland, United States.

Notes

Unincorporated communities in Dorchester County, Maryland
Unincorporated communities in Maryland